Inchiyani is a village near Mundakayam in Kanjirappally Taluk of Kerala, India.

History 
Sir C.P. Ramaswamy Iyer took over  land of First Freedom Fighter Chempil Arayan Ananthapadmanabhan Valiya Arayan situated in Edakunnam, Erumely and Ranni.

Location 

References 

Villages in Kottayam district